is a 1990 Japanese action film directed by Tōru Murakawa, and produced by Toei Company in association with Mitsui & Co. and Tohokushinsha Film. The screenplay was written by Murakawa with Makoto Takada. The film stars Yūji Oda, Naomi Zaizen, Masato Furuoya, Masato Nagamori, and Toshio Kurosawa. The title refers to the highest rank of the JASDF's F-15J training program.

The film's aerial scenes were produced in cooperation with the JASDF, using the Mitsubishi F-15J - the country's variant of the McDonnell Douglas F-15 Eagle. Seen by movie critics as a copy of Top Gun, Best Guy was a box-office failure in Japan, earning 230 million.

Plot
Fresh from his transfer from Nyutabaru Air Base to Chitose Air Base, Lieutenant Hideo "Goku" Kajitani joins the 201st Tactical Air Squadron and participates in the base's three-week fighter training program with the goal of attaining the title of "Best Guy". Despite having his pilot's license revoked three times at Nyutabaru, he has earned the title  due to his natural expertise in piloting the Mitsubishi F-15J. Goku feels animosity towards his trainer Major Nobuaki "Zombie" Yoshinaga, who he feels is responsible for his brother Tetsuo's death in a flight accident years ago. At the same time, he develops a rivalry with Captain Teruichi "Imagine" Nadaka, who dislikes Goku's reckless piloting skills. For the training program, Goku is assigned to the Fox team led by Lt. Colonel Tadayuki "Odyssey" Yamamoto, while Imagine becomes part of the Bear team led by Zombie. During his time at Chitose, Goku befriends Miyuki Mizuno, a video director sent to the base to film a music video for Canadian singer Sheree, but decides to cover the Best Guy program instead.

One day, Goku and Imagine scramble when a couple of Soviet Tu-16 Badgers enter Japanese airspace. Following a dogfight with the Su-27 Flankers, the duo manages to drive the intruding aircraft away. On their way back to Chitose, Goku suddenly experiences vertigo and loses control of his plane before he ejects and is safely rescued at sea. Because of this, he loses confidence in flying. Zombie visits Goku at his quarters, but Goku's hatred leads to him attacking Zombie before the latter reveals the truth about his brother's death. On that fateful night, Zombie (who used the call sign "Demon") was Tetsuo's radar intercept officer when their F-4EJ Phantom II flew into an electrical storm outside Komatsu Base and Tetsuo blacked out from vertigo; Zombie ejected before their plane crashed. Feeling further demotivated by the truth, Goku leaves for Kyushu to reconcile with an old lover, only to discover that she has moved on with another man. He then travels to Tokyo to meet up with Miyuki, who reveals that her documentary video was cancelled due to a sponsor dropping out of the project. After seeing her emotions, Goku realizes his purpose in life and returns to Chitose.

The final day of training is decided between Goku and Imagine, with Miyuki filming the event. During the fierce mock dogfight, Imagine scores the kill on Goku and is awarded the title of "Best Guy" while Goku takes the runner-up title of "Top Gun" and Second Lieutenant Atsuo "Duck" Nakagawa takes the third place title of "Early Bird". Following the program, Odyssey retires and bids farewell to the 201st Squadron, with Goku and Imagine escorting his plane off the base.

Cast
 Yūji Oda as Lieutenant Hideo "Goku" Kajitani
 Naomi Zaizen as Miyuki Mizuno
 Masato Furuoya as Major Nobuaki "Zombie/Demon" Yoshinaga
 Masato Nagamori as Captain Teruichi "Imagine" Nadaka
 Toshio Kurosawa as Lt. Colonel Tadayuki "Odyssey" Yamamoto
 Masahiro Sudou as Major Haruo "Thunder" Yashiki
 Mikihisa Azuma as Second Lieutenant Yoshitaka "Robin" Muramatsu
 Zenkichi Yoneyama as Second Lieutenant Atsuo "Duck" Nakagawa
 Hikaru Kurosaki as Junior Officer Yusuke "Yunker" Tateishi
 Chiharu Iwamoto as Second Lieutenant Akiko Shibata
 Akiji Kobayashi as Yoshi Kamogawa
 Masaru Matsuda as Tsuyoshi Tokuda
 Jun Negami as Taichirō Kanō
 Akiko Kana as Yumiko Yoshinaga
 Chiyoko Shimakura as the Chief Nurse
 Takaaki Enoki as Tetsuo "Apollo" Kajitani
 Naoto Takenaka as the Air Traffic Controller

Soundtrack

The soundtrack album was released by BMG Victor on October 21, 1990 and features songs performed by Canadian singer Sheree, who also makes an appearance in the beginning of the film.

Track listing

Marketing
Hasegawa issued a "Best Guy" edition of their 1/48 scale F-15J Eagle model kit to promote the film.

See also
 Top Gun

References

External links
 Best Guy at AllCinema
 Best Guy at Kinenote
 

1990 films
1990 action films
1990s Japanese-language films
Japanese aviation films
Films set in Hokkaido
Films shot in Hokkaido
Japan Air Self-Defense Force
Toei Company films
1990s Japanese films